Chabab Rif Al Hoceima is a Moroccan basketball club based in Al Hoceima. The team is part of the multisports club with the same name.

Honours

National leagues
Division Excellence
Runner-up (1): 2016
Moroccan Throne Cup
Runner-up (1): 2017

African leagues
FIBA Africa Clubs Champions Cup
Quarterfinalist: 2011

References

Basketball teams in Morocco